Daniel Hall (born 14 June 1999) is an Australian professional footballer who plays as a central defender for Central Coast Mariners.

Club career
Hall made his senior club debut for Western Pride FC in 2017, scoring his first senior goal against South West Queensland Thunder FC. He came on as a substitute late in the 2017 NPL Queensland Grand Final, and was fouled, allowing Dylan Wenzel-Halls to score the winning goal from the resultant free-kick.

In November 2020, A-League side Central Coast Mariners signed Hall to a senior contract after Hall had previously captained Central Coast Mariners Academy. Hall signed a two-year contract extension with the Mariners in June 2021.

International career
In September 2021, Hall said that he would be "very proud" to represent Fiji and had been in contact with Fiji Football Association ahead of the OFC 2022 FIFA World Cup qualification tournament in March 2022.

References

External links

1999 births
Living people
Australian soccer players
Association football midfielders
Central Coast Mariners FC players
National Premier Leagues players
A-League Men players
Australian people of Fijian descent
Soccer players from Melbourne